Bilohorivka is a village in Bakhmut Raion (district) in Donetsk Oblast of eastern Ukraine, at about  NNE from the centre of Donetsk city and at about  E from Kramatorsk.

The village came under attack by Russian forces during the Russian invasion of Ukraine in 2022.

As of 27 June 2022, according to the Ukrainian-based DeepState map, the eastern end of Bilohorivka (east of the main highway) was occupied by Russian forces.

On 30 November 2022, the Russian Armed Forces re-captured the village.

References

Villages in Bakhmut Raion